The Cathay Building was opened in 1939 by Dato Loke Wan Tho as the headquarters for the British Malaya Broadcasting Corporation. Located at 2 Handy Road in the Museum Planning Area of Singapore, the building was most known for its air-conditioned theatre known as the Cathay Cinema, then a technological marvel and the first to be built in Singapore. Cathay Building was the first skyscraper in Singapore and tallest building in Southeast Asia at that time.

History

1930s: Opening and initial years
The supposed 16 storey (11 storey upon completion) Cathay Building was designed by British architect Frank W Brewer. The Cathay Building consisted of the Cathay Cinema, a restaurant and the dance hall on the ground floor, as well as a roof garden above the cinema and a residential storey block with a penthouse.

The first part of the Cathay Building was opened on 3 October 1939 with the 1,300-seat Cathay Cinema, the dance hall and the Cathay Restaurant. On 1 July 1940, the 11 storey residential block was opened for occupancy, with the owners Mrs Loke Wan and Loke Wan Tho occupied the eleventh floor.  The building was the first and tallest skyscraper in Singapore and in Southeast Asia, at a height of 83.5 metres from the Dhoby Ghaut entrance to the top of the building's water tower. Its theatre was the island's first air-conditioned cinema and public building, and where one could sit in an arm chair to watch a film; a rare amenity during that time. The building was also used as a landmark for final landing approach at Singapore's first purpose-built civilian airport, Kallang Airport.

1940s: World War II and Indian National Army

At the beginning of World War II in 1942, the building was converted to a Red Cross casualty station. When Singapore fell to the Japanese, it was used to house the Japanese Broadcasting Department, the Military Propaganda Department, the Military Information Bureau and the broadcast department of the Indian National Army's Provisional government of Free India during the occupation period. On 21 October 1943, Subhas Chandra Bose announced the formation of the Provisional Government of Azad Hind (Free India) at Cathay Building with himself as the Head of State, Prime Minister and Minister of War. The Japanese utilised the building to broadcast propaganda in the Japanese language. It was also the residence of film director Yasujirō Ozu from 1944 till the end of the war.

When the war ended in 1945, it served as the headquarters for Admiral Lord Mountbatten while serving as the Supreme Allied Commander South East Asia Theatre of the South East Asia Command (SEAC). When the SEAC was disbanded a year later, the building was converted back to a cinema and a hotel. The cinema was the first to show American and British films in Singapore. A new air-conditioning plant was installed in the building in 1948. The colonial government vacated the building to be returned to the Cathay Organisation. The Cathay Restaurant was officially reopened on 1 May 1948 under the management of Cathay Restaurant Ltd.

1950-70s: Hotel and nightclub 

On 9 January 1954, the building reopened as Cathay Hotel with 60 rooms and subsequently expanded to 170 rooms. It had a restaurant, nightclub, swimming pool and shopping arcade.

Cathay Hotel was closed on 30 December 1970, with the 10 floors had been converted into office premises and the top floor occupied by the Cathay Organisation by July 1974.

The building was refaced in 1978 with a new look by STS Leong. The original design was shadowed by the new facade.

1980-90s: Cineplex 

Cathay Building was the location for the first Orange Julius outlet in Singapore, which opened in 1982. In 1990, Cathay Organisation opened Singapore's first arthouse cinema, The Picturehouse adjacent to Cathay Building. The main Cathay cinema was then converted into a two-hall cineplex during that period.

Redevelopment and preservation
In 1999, Cathay announced the S$100 million plans to redevelop the whole complex. Cathay Building and the Picturehouse would show its last movie in 2000 before closing for redevelopment. The front facade of its theatre building structure was gazetted as a national monument for conservation on 10 February 2003, while the rest of the building structure was later demolished. Thus the new building incorporated conservation of the original art-deco façade of the 1939 and combined together with a modern-day design by Paul Tange of Tange Associates Japan and RDC Architects Pte Ltd Singapore. The Cathay as it is currently known, was opened on 24 March 2006. The building houses retail, food & beverage outlets and an 8-screen Cathay Cineplex which includes The Picturehouse. The Cathay Residences opened towards the end of 2006.

See also
Cathay Organisation

References

External links

Official website of Cathay

Demolished buildings and structures in Singapore
Buildings and structures demolished in 2003
Former skyscrapers
Cinemas in Singapore
Landmarks in Singapore
National monuments of Singapore
Office buildings completed in 1940
Orchard Road
Museum Planning Area
1940 establishments in the Straits Settlements
1940 establishments in the British Empire
2003 disestablishments in Singapore
20th-century architecture in Singapore